Pavón is a town in the Constitución Department, in Santa Fe Province, Argentina.

Schools 
 "Unidad Nacional", 222 pupils
 Center for Adult learning 223 ("Centro Alfabetizador 223"), 17 pupils

Sports 
 Club Atlético Benjamín Matienzo
 Club Atlético Pavón
 Club Alumni

See also 
 Battle of Pavón

External links
 Provincial site

Populated places in Santa Fe Province